Rubino is a family name of Italian origin. Notable people with the surname include:

 Anthony Rubino (1921-1983), American football player
 Antonio Rubino, Italian illustrator and cartoonist
 Beth Rubino, American film art director
 Bonaventura Rubino,  Italian composer
 Eduardo Rubiño, Spanish politician
 Gennaro Rubino, Italian anarchist
 Giorgio Rubino (born 1986), Italian racewalker
 Guy Rubino, Canadian chef
 Peter Rubino (born 1947), American sculptor
 Raffaele Rubino (born 1978), Italian footballer
 Ralph Rubino, American saxophone player
 Renzo Rubino, Italian singer

See also 
 Rubino, Ivory Coast
 Rubino di Cantavenna
 Luis Rubiños
 Rubini
 Rubio (disambiguation)

Italian-language surnames